Zünd, also spelled Zuend, is a Swiss surname. Notable people with this surname include:

 Andreas Zünd (born 1954), Swiss jurist
 Robert Zünd (1826–1909), Swiss landscape painter
 Stephan Zünd (born 1969), Swiss ski jumper
 Werner Zünd (born 1948), Swiss football manager

Surnames of Swiss origin